
Gmina Ceków-Kolonia is a rural gmina (administrative district) in Kalisz County, Greater Poland Voivodeship, in west-central Poland.

Villages
Gmina Ceków-Kolonia contains the villages and settlements of Beznatka, Bielawy, Bystrek, Ceków, Ceków-Kolonia, Cierpiatka, Gostynie, Huta, Kamień, Kamień-Kolonia, Korek, Kosmów, Kosmów-Kolonia, Kuźnica, Magdalenów, Morawin, Nowa Plewnia, Nowe Prażuchy, Odpadki, Olendry, Orli Staw, Orzeł, Plewnia, Podzborów, Przedzeń, Przespolew Kościelny, Przespolew Pański, Radzany, Stare Prażuchy, Świdle, Szadek and Szadykierz.

Neighbouring gminas
Gmina Ceków-Kolonia is bordered by the gminas of Kawęczyn, Koźminek, Lisków, Malanów, Mycielin, Opatówek and Żelazków.

References
Polish official population figures 2006

Cekow-Kolonia
Gmina Cekow Kolonia